{{DISPLAYTITLE:C24H27NO2}}
The molecular formula C24H27NO2 (molar mass: 361.48 g/mol) may refer to:

 Levophenacylmorphan
 Octocrylene
 N-Phenethylnordesomorphine

Molecular formulas